Larry Payne was a sixteen-year old African American teenager who was killed following a march in support of the Memphis sanitation strike on Thursday, March 28, 1968, in Memphis, Tennessee. He was the only fatality on that day although the New Pittsburgh Courier reported 60 injured and 276 arrested.

Martin Luther King Jr. called Payne's mother, Lizzie Payne, on the phone to console her after her son's killing by Patrolman Leslie Dean Jones.

Events leading up to Payne's death

Conflicting accounts describe the looting that occurred in tandem with the march on Thursday March 28, 1968 that led to a city-wide curfew and Mayor Loeb calling the Tennessese National Guard. According to multiple witnesses, as Payne emerged from a basement in the Fowler Homes housing development, police officer Leslie Dean Jones pressed the barrel of a sawed-off shotgun into Payne's stomach and fired, killing him. Payne reportedly had his hands up prior to his killing and had asked the officer not to shoot. Jones later claimed that Payne was holding a large butcher knife when he emerged from the basement, a statement denied by witnesses to the killing. The Shelby County grand jury did not press charges, and the Department of Justice declared that there was insufficient evidence to prosecute Jones when investigating him for civil rights abuses.

Payne's funeral

There was a five-hour wake the day before the funeral on Monday, April 1, 1968. Six hundred attended his funeral at Clayborn Temple on Tuesday, April 2, 1968. Striking sanitation workers, clergy members who supported the strike, and national television representatives were all in attendance, as well as the students and faculty of Mitchell Road High School where Payne was enrolled prior to his death. Rev. B.T. Dumas, pastor of New Philadelphia Baptist Church gave the eulogy entitled "Man Is Like Grass And Is Cut Down in Various Stages of Life."  Rev. Dumas made no reference to the unusual circumstances of Payne's death. Payne's mother, Lizzie Mason Payne, had to be led from the church because she was so full of grief. The Washington Post quoted her as saying: "They killed you like a dog."

Events after Payne's death 
King planned to visit Payne's mother during his next visit to Memphis, but was killed before the visit could occur. He was assassinated seven days after Payne's killing, on April 4, 1968, when he returned to Memphis in an effort to hold a peaceful march unmarred by looting and violence.

After Payne's death, Lizzie Payne, his mother, moved to Flint, Michigan.

References

External links
 "My thoughts: Wither Larry Payne, civil rights and hallowed grounds?" Commercial Appeal, February 27, 2016.
 Interview with Larry Payne's mother, brother, and sister (Recorded: March 2, 2010)
 FBI to Re-Open Memphis Civil Rights era cold case (WMC Channel 5 News)
 For Larry Payne (a poem commissioned by Fusion Theatre Company and written by Hakim Bellamy, November 9, 2013)

 Who We Are: Chronicle of Racism in America ( Netflix documentary 2022 )

1950s births
1968 deaths
1968 labor disputes and strikes
History of Memphis, Tennessee
Civil rights protests in the United States
Martin Luther King Jr.
Labor disputes in Tennessee
1968 in Tennessee
Police brutality in the United States
Place of birth missing
Police
Deaths by firearm in Tennessee
Deaths by person in Tennessee
African Americans shot dead by law enforcement officers in the United States
Incidents of violence against boys
Law enforcement in Tennessee